This is the list of all Brøndby IF's European matches.

Summary

By competition

Accurate as of 11 August 2022

Source: UEFA.comPld = Matches played; W = Matches won; D = Matches drawn; L = Matches lost; GF = Goals for; GA = Goals against. Defunct competitions indicated in italics.

Results

UEFA club coefficient ranking

Current
As of 26 November 2021

Rankings since 2006

As of 26 November 2021

References

Brøndby IF
Danish football clubs in international competitions